Dracula is a horror drama television series. The series, a reimagining of Bram Stoker's 1897 novel Dracula, was produced by London-based Carnival Films; it aired in the United States on NBC and in the United Kingdom on Sky Living from October 25, 2013, to January 24, 2014. It was created by Cole Haddon and Daniel Knauf, while Daniel Knauf served as showrunner and head writer.

The series was given a straight-to-series commitment of ten episodes. It was cancelled after one season.

Premise

After being revived by a mysterious figure through the blood of a graveyard thief, Dracula arrives in London posing as Alexander Grayson, an American entrepreneur who claims to bring modern science to Victorian society. In reality, he seeks revenge on the Order of the Dragon, a power-hungry organization that ruined his life centuries earlier. Abraham Van Helsing, who was later revealed to have brought Dracula back to life, is also out for revenge, and the two form an uneasy alliance. Their plans are complicated when Dracula becomes fascinated with Mina Murray, a woman who seems to be a reincarnation of his dead wife, Ilona.

Cast and characters

Main cast
Jonathan Rhys Meyers as Dracula / Alexander Grayson / Vlad Tepes
Jessica De Gouw as Mina Murray / Ilona, a medical student and the reincarnation of Dracula's long-dead wife.
 Thomas Kretschmann as Abraham Van Helsing, Mina's lecturer at university and a former member of the Order of the Dragon. Kretschmann previously played Dracula in the 2012 Italian horror film Dracula 3D.
 Victoria Smurfit as Lady Jayne Wetherby, a fashionable huntswoman who is immediately enticed by the King of Vampires.
 Oliver Jackson-Cohen as Jonathan Harker, a gauche journalist who is desperate to climb the ranks of aristocracy.
 Nonso Anozie as R. M. Renfield, Dracula's loyal confidant and keeper of secrets.
 Katie McGrath as Lucy Westenra, a rich society girl who harbors secret romantic feelings for Mina, her best friend.

Recurring cast
 Ben Miles as Lord Browning, the leader of the Order of the Dragon.
 Robert Bathurst as Lord Thomas Davenport
 Miklós Bányai as Szabo, Harker's friend and former co-worker at the newspaper.
 Phil McKee as Joseph Kowalski, Grayson's head technician.
 Anthony Calf as Dr. William Murray, Mina's father and the director of Bethlem Royal Hospital.
 Jemma Redgrave as Minerva Westenra, Lucy's mother.
 Tamer Hassan as Kaha Ruma aka "The Moroccan".

Production
According to co-creator Haddon, who in 2023 wrote a retrospective on the series titled The Horror of Dracula, the series was born in February 2011, as a result of his feature spec Hyde, another monster reinvention, which got on the prestigious Black List. Gore Verbinski passed on the project, and it seemingly stalled until September 27, when NBC bought the pilot script. The subsequent development and production were arduous, with an unnamed producer on the series meddling with several key decisions, and nearly causing Haddon to quit several times. The essay series drew strong commendation from other television professionals for its insight and honesty, such as showrunners Mickey Fisher and Steven S. DeKnight.

The series was shot in Budapest. Prior to the series premiere, NBC released an animated web companion entitled Dracula Rising, which serves as a prequel that depicts the origin story of the titular character.

Episodes

Awards and nominations

See also
Vampire film
List of vampire television series

References

External links
Official Sky website
Official NBC website
 

2010s British drama television series
2013 British television series debuts
2014 British television series endings
2010s American drama television series
2013 American television series debuts
2014 American television series endings
English-language television shows
NBC original programming
Television series by Universal Television
Dracula television shows
2010s American horror television series
2010s American LGBT-related drama television series
2010s British LGBT-related television series
2010s British LGBT-related drama television series
British horror fiction television series
Sky Living original programming
Television shows about reincarnation
Television shows set in London
Television shows filmed in Hungary
2010s American supernatural television series
2010s British horror television series